Buddhi Narayan Shrestha is a Nepalese geographer specialising on the border issues of Nepal. He served as the director general of the Survey Department of Nepal, and is currently the managing director of Bhumichitra Mapping Company. His book titled Boundary of Nepal has won the Madan Puraskar prize.

Life and career 
Shrestha received a Masters Degree in Geography with Land Surveying from the Tribhuvan University in 1964. After receiving training in land surveying at the West Bengal Survey Institute in Calcutta, he carried out Ph. D. research at the Tribhuvan University. His research area was dealing with border issues of Nepal with "special reference to the demarcation of Mechi and Mahakali riverine segments" and their implications for the border management system of Nepal.

Shrestha worked in the Land Survey Department of Nepal for 27 years, in positions ranging from survey officer to director general, retiring in 1992. Afterwards, he became a consultant and later the managing director for the Bhumichitra Mapping Company.

Shrestha served on the Nepal–India and Nepal–China Joint boundary Committees. He serves on the Board of Nepal's Institute of Foreign Affairs, as a nominee of the Nepal Government. He is the President of Nepal Institution of Chartered Surveyors.

Works 
Shrestha has authored seven books on border demarcation and management of Nepal, which include:
 Boundary of Nepal (in Nepali), 2000.
 Border Management of Nepal, Bhumichitra Co. P. Ltd, 2003. .
 Border War/Sima Sangram, Ratna Sagar Prakashan, 2013.

Boundary of Nepal won the prestigious Madan Puraskar prize of Nepal in 2000.

References

External links
 
 

India–Nepal relations
China–Nepal relations
Nepalese scholars
Living people
Year of birth missing (living people)